Hebsabad (also Romanized as Ḩebsābād; also known as Ḩefz̧ābād) is a village in Daman Kuh Rural District, in the Central District of Esfarayen County, North Khorasan Province, Iran. At the 2006 census, its population was 369, in 65 families.

References 

Populated places in Esfarayen County